The Yew Tree Estate is a residential area of Walsall and West Bromwich located at the border with both Sandwell and the Walsall Borough in the West Midlands County, England. The Sandwell Ward is called Great Barr with Yew Tree with which at the 2011 census had a population of 12,597.

The area compromises of housing, small shops, a church, a community centre and healthcare centre.

Local Facilities
Yew Tree has a large amount of common land, as well as a community centre, health centre and play area by the local row of shops on Redwood Road. Currently on this row of shops are two convenience stores, a computer repair shop, a chip shop, fruit and veg store, a takeout cafe, hairdressers, a barbers and a chemist. There is also a pub on Thorncroft Way which has altered from its original name of 'The Archers to The Orchard and now is currently using its original name of 'The Archers'. It is a community local with three pool teams, three darts teams,a domino team, a quiz on Monday nights and live entertainment at the weekends. The Yew Tree Estate has a Church on Redwood Road dedicated to the Feast of the Annunciation and is licensed for Baptisms, Weddings & Funerals. The Parish Priest is also the Vicar of St Gabriel's Fullbrook.

Schools
The estate was previously home to two primary schools, Fir Tree and Yew Tree. In 2006 both schools were merged under the Yew Tree name however they continued to operate at both sites, one on Birchfield Way (the original Yew Tree) and the other on Greenside Way (Fir Tree). The Birchfield Way site has been partially developed with a new building being built not only with extra classrooms for also rooms for the local community. In 2011 the Greenside Way site shut and all children are now taught from the Birchfield Way site. In 2012 the Greenside Way site was demolished and the land is now likely to be redeveloped. Refurbished in 2019, Joseph Lekkie Academy provides secondary school education in the area located on Walstead Road.

Public Transport
The nearest buses to serve the Yew Tree Estate indirectly are National Express West Midlands routes 4, 4H, and 4M, and Diamond West Midlands Routes 4 and 4H, along with Diamond's 401E which serves the estate directly, along with National Express West Midlands route 45 which stops outside Fir Tree School on Greenside Way, and serves Walstead Rd.

Rail
Tame Bridge Parkway railway station is only a 5-minute bus or car journey away from Yew Tree, providing frequent trains to Walsall, Rugeley Trent Valley or Birmingham New Street.

Famous people
K.K. Downing – Judas Priest guitarist
James Driscoll – inventor of the Shoe People
Ian Hill – Judas Priest bassist
Matthew Marsden – Actor

References

Areas of Sandwell
West Bromwich